This is a list of Marathi (Indian Marathi-language) films that were released in 2019.

January to March

April to June

July to September

October to December

References

External links
 Marathi Movies Year 2019

2019
Marathi
2019 in Indian cinema